Jordan Mattern (born February 1, 1993) is an American swimmer who specializes in middle-distance freestyle events.  At the 2013 World Aquatics Championships in Barcelona, Mattern won a gold medal as a member of the winning U.S. team in the women's 4×200-metre freestyle.  She attends the University of Georgia, where she swims for coach Jack Bauerle's Georgia Bulldogs swimming and diving team. She is currently married to fellow UGA Alum and former Olympian, Andrew Gemmell.

References

External links
  Jordan Mattern – National Team swimmer profile at TeamUSA.org
 Jordan Mattern – University of Georgia athlete profile at GeorgiaDogs.com

1993 births
Living people
American female freestyle swimmers
Georgia Bulldogs women's swimmers
Sportspeople from Aurora, Colorado
Swimmers at the 2010 Summer Youth Olympics
World Aquatics Championships medalists in swimming